The following events related to sociology occurred in the 1870s.

1871
Pierre Guillaume Frédéric le Play's Le Organisation de Famille is published.
Carl Menger's Principles of Economics is published.
Lewis Henry Morgan's Systems of Consanguinity and Affinity of the Human Family is published.
Sir Edward Burnett Tylor's In Primitive Culture is published.

1873
Herbert Spencer's The Study of Sociology is published.

1874
Francis Galton's English men of science : their nature and nurture is published.
Pierre Guillaume Frédéric Le Play's La réforme sociale en France déduite de l’observation comparée des peuples Européens is published.
Henry Sidgwick's The Method of Ethics is published.

1875
Francis Galton's Statistics by intercomparison, with remarks on the law of frequency of error is published.
Frederic Harrison's Order and Progress is published.

1878
Friedrich Engels' Anti-Dühring is published.

1879
 Henry George's, Progress and Poverty is published.

Sociology
Sociology timelines